Jason Kubler was the defending champion but lost in the second round to Brydan Klein.

Jordan Thompson won the title after defeating Yoshihito Nishioka 6–3, 6–4 in the final.

Seeds

Draw

Finals

Top half

Bottom half

References
Main Draw
Qualifying Draw

Latrobe City Traralgon ATP Challenger - Singles
2018 Singles